Siren is a surname which may refer to:

 Heikki Siren (1918–2013), Finnish architect, son of J. S. Sirén
 J. S. Sirén (1889–1961), Finnish architect
 Jon Siren (born 1978), American keyboardist and drummer, co-founder of the band Mankind Is Obsolete
 Kaija Siren (1920–2001), Finnish architect, wife of and co-worker with Heikki Siren
 Osvald Sirén (1879–1966), Finnish-born Swedish art historian
 Urho Sirén (1932–2002), Finnish cyclist
 Yrjö Sirola (1876–1936), Finnish socialist politician, teacher and newspaper editor born Yrjö Sirén